Stretton Grandison is a hamlet and small civil parish in Herefordshire, England. The population of the civil parish at the 2011 census was 175.

It is on the A417 road (a Roman Road, hence the settlement's name "Stretton") to the north-east of Hereford. The River Frome flows along the parish's southern boundary.

The Church of St Lawrence, dating from its 14th-century rebuilding of an earlier church, is a Grade I listed building.

References

External links

Villages in Herefordshire
Civil parishes in Herefordshire